Brian Branch (born October 22, 2001) is an American football safety for the Alabama Crimson Tide.

Early life and high school career
Branch grew up in Fayetteville, Georgia, and attended Sandy Creek High School. He was named the Georgia 5A Ironman of the Year as a senior. Branch was rated a four-star recruit and committed to play college football at Alabama over offers from Ohio State, Oklahoma, and Tennessee.

College career
Branch played in 12 games during his freshman season at Alabama and made 27 tackles with seven passes defended and two interceptions. As a sophomore he made 55 tackles with five tackles for loss, one sack, and nine passes defended. Branch led the Crimson Tide with eight tackles and broke up two passes in Alabama's 27-6 win over Cincinnati in the 2021 Cotton Bowl Classic. Branch entered his junior season as one of the top safety prospects for the 2023 NFL Draft.

References

External links
 
 Alabama Crimson Tide bio

2001 births
Living people
Alabama Crimson Tide football players
Players of American football from Georgia (U.S. state)
American football safeties
American football cornerbacks